Mzimela is a surname. Notable people with the surname include:

Mbongeni Mzimela (born 1985), South African footballer
Siza Mzimela, South African business executive

Surnames of African origin